Charlotte Link (born 5 October 1963 in Frankfurt am Main) is a German writer. She is among the most successful contemporary authors writing in German.

Life
Charlotte Link is the daughter of well-known German writer and journalist Almuth Link. She wrote her first work, Die schöne Helena, when she was just 16 years old and published it at the age of 19.

She is known as much for novels about contemporary life as for psychological detective novels in the English manner. Her books Sturmzeit, Wilde Lupinen, and Die Stunde der Erben form a trilogy. These, among others, have been filmed for TV series for the German television station ZDF.

Her novel Am Ende des Schweigens was nominated in 2004 for the fiction category of the Deutsche Bücherpreis (German Book Prize), while her book Die Rosenzüchterin, published in 2000, remained for several weeks at the top of the Spiegel bestseller list.

Selected works

Awards
In 2007, Link was awarded the Goldene Feder (Golden Feather) for her literary achievements.

Bibliography

References

External links

 portal.d-nb.de Books by or about Charlotte Link in the German National Library. 
 

People from Wiesbaden
1963 births
German crime fiction writers
Living people
German women novelists
Women crime fiction writers